The Billboard 200, published in Billboard magazine, is a weekly chart that ranks the 200 highest-selling music albums and EPs in the United States. This data is compiled by Nielsen SoundScan from a universe of merchants that represents more than 90% of the U.S. music retail market. The sample includes music stores and the music departments at electronics and department stores, as well as direct-to-consumer transactions and internet sales.

Chart history

See also
1998 in music
List of number-one albums (United States)

References

1998
United States Albums